Garhshankar Assembly constituency (Sl. No.: 45) is a Punjab Legislative Assembly constituency representing Garhshankar in Hoshiarpur district, Punjab state, India. Currently, it is represented by Jai Krishan Singh of the Aam Aadmi Party who is also Deputy Speaker of Punjab Assembly.  The last assembly elections were held in February 2022.

Members of the Legislative Assembly

Election results

2022 
 

-->

2017

References

External links
  

Assembly constituencies of Punjab, India
Hoshiarpur district